The Shire of Mansfield was a local government area about  northeast of Melbourne, the state capital of Victoria, Australia.

History

Mansfield was incorporated as a road district on 6 January 1865, and became a shire on 31 December 1866. On 30 May 1919, it annexed part of the Shire of Howqua, becoming the shire's Howqua Riding.

On 18 November 1994, the Shire of Mansfield was abolished, and along with the City of Benalla, the Shire of Benalla and the Warrenbayne district from the Shire of Violet Town, was merged into the newly created Shire of Delatite. The Shire of Delatite itself was abolished in 2002, with its former area divided between the Rural City of Benalla and the Shire of Mansfield, created with largely the same territory as the previous shire.

Wards

The Shire of Mansfield was divided into four ridings in 1990, each of which elected three councillors:
 Central Riding
 Alpine Riding
 Delatite Riding
 Midland Riding

Towns and localities

 Ancona
 Bonnie Doon
 Gaffneys Creek
 Goughs Bay
 Jamieson
 Kevington
 Maindample
 Mansfield*
 Matlock
 Merrijig
 Merton
 Mount Buller
 Tolmie
 Woodfield
 Woods Point

* Council seat.

Population

References

External links
 Victorian Places - Mansfield and Mansfield Shire

Mansfield